Stanisław Zawadzki (1743–1806) was a Polish architect, representative of late-baroque and classicism, inclined towards Palladian architecture and precursor of the empire style in Polish architecture, Major General of the Army of Polish–Lithuanian Commonwealth.

Author of palaces in Śmiełów (1797), Dobrzyca (1799), Lubostroń (1800), defensive buildings, military buildings in Kamieniec Podolski and Warsaw.

Biography
Zawadzki was born in 1743 in Warsaw. He graduated in St. Luke Academy in Rome. In 1769 he became a professor and in 1776 an honorable member of the academy.

He died on October 19, 1806, in Warsaw.

References
 
 

Generals of the Polish–Lithuanian Commonwealth
1743 births
1806 deaths
Polish Baroque architects
Ukrainian Baroque architects
Artists from Warsaw